CB2 or similar, may refer to:

 Cannabinoid receptor type 2
 Crash Bandicoot 2: Cortex Strikes Back, a video game developed by Naughty Dog for PlayStation
 CB2, a division of Crate & Barrel
 Child-robot with Biomimetic Body - a Robot at the Osaka University that mimics infant learning. 
 USS Guam (CB-2)

See also

 
 CB (disambiguation)
 CBB (disambiguation)

pt:CB2